The 1985–86 LSU Tigers basketball team represented Louisiana State University in the Southeastern Conference (SEC) during the 1985-86 NCAA Division I men's basketball season.  It is best known for being the lowest seeded team (11th) in the NCAA tournament to reach the Final Four (later matched by George Mason in 2006, VCU in 2011,  Loyola–Chicago in 2018, and UCLA in 2021). They remain the only 11 seed to beat the 1, 2, and 3 seeds in their region in the same tournament.

Season 
The team is also remembered for overcoming numerous obstacles during that season. Star forward Jerry Reynolds had left LSU early for the NBA draft. The Tigers originally had two seven-footers and a third player near that height on their roster, but only one was available by the start of the season—6–11 Damon Vance was declared academically ineligible, and 7-1 freshman and future NBA player Tito Horford either left the team or was dismissed, depending on the source. The other seven-footer, Zoran Jovanovich, suffered a season-ending knee injury during the team's Christmas break. Two other players were declared academically ineligible—Dennis Brown, reportedly a solid engineering student, took too few courses in his major and was ruled out for the entire season, and star forward Nikita Wilson failed two courses in the fall semester, ruling him out for the spring semester. As a result of these losses, Ricky Blanton switched positions from guard to center, and team captain Don Redden said at the time that the Tigers had "gone from an NBA-size team to a big junior high team." The team was then hit with a chickenpox outbreak, with star forward John Williams and backup forward Bernard Woodside hospitalized for a week and the team quarantined for several days. LSU was forced to reschedule what was intended to be a nationally televised game against Auburn due to a lack of healthy players, and coach Dale Brown even went so far as to draft football player Chris Carrier as emergency cover.

Roster

Schedule and results

|-
!colspan=12 style="background:#33297B; color:#FDD023;"| Non-conference regular season

|-
!colspan=12 style="background:#33297B; color:#FDD023;"| SEC regular season

|-
!colspan=12 style="background:#33297B"| SEC tournament

|-
!colspan=12 style="background:#33297B;"| NCAA tournament

Rankings

References

LSU Tigers basketball seasons
Lsu
NCAA Division I men's basketball tournament Final Four seasons
Lsu
LSU
LSU